The Central Military Band of the Korean People's Army, also sometimes known as the Korean People's Army Marching Band or DPRK Army Orchestra is a North Korean musical group/marching band based in Pyongyang and is the sole military band of the Korean People's Army. The Women's Military Marching Band of the Ministry of People's Security of the DPRK is the all-female unit of the central band.

History 
On February 23, 1946, the Military Band of the Pyongyang Military School was created, which became the predecessor of the Band of the Korean People's Army. Its first performance was at the inaugural ceremony of the Pyongyang Institute founded by President Kim Il Sung. In June 1950, it became the Band of the Ministry of People's Security, and later that year, the band became attached as a unit of the Supreme Guard Command's Honor Guard Battalion. By September 1954, full control of the band was given to the Ministry of Public Security, serving for the remainder of the Cold War and the 1990s before being reorganized into a separate entity in June 1998 as a directly reporting unit of the General Political Bureau of the Korean People's Army, tasked as the primary unit for the military music activities throughout the whole KPA.

Activities 
The CMB-KPA, as the premier and principal band of the whole KPA, presides over all garrison and unit bands within the KPA's service branches and the Worker-Peasant Red Guards. North Korean leader Kim Jong Un has described the band as one that is "instilling revolutionary enthusiasm and fighting spirit into all the service personnel and people."

The band is similar to United States college marching bands in that they both solely specialize in military style marching, notably during ceremonial parades and public performances. The band has been known to play pop, brass & military music during many of its performances.

Parades and ceremonies 
 Military parades in North Korea
 Party Foundation Day (parades on jubilee years)
 Military Foundation Day (parades on jubilee years)
 Day of the Foundation of the Republic (parades on jubilee years)
 Day of the Sun (2012 and 2017 parades)
 State funeral of Kim Il-sung
 State funeral of Kim Jong-il

Performances

Notable concerts 
 Concert for the state visit of Russian President Vladimir Putin (2000)
 Joint concert with the Central Military Band of the People's Liberation Army of China in honor of the 60th anniversary of the Korean Armistice (2013)
 Joint concert with the Central Military Band of the Ministry of Defense of Russia in Pyongyang (2014)
 70th anniversary concert (2016)

Festivals 

 The Amur Waves International Military Bands Festival (2012 and 2015)
 Spasskaya Tower Military Music Festival and Tattoo (2019)

See also 

 Korean People's Army
 Music of North Korea

References

External links 
 The band marching during the celebrations of Army Day
 DPRK North Korea Girl's Brass Band
 Joint Performance of Military Bands of North Korea and Russia
 North Korean Military Band toured Russia
 North Korean Military Band marches through Pyongyang in Memory of 60th Anniversary of War Victory
 North Korean army band performs at Moscow's Red Square
 

Korean military bands
Musical groups established in 1946
Military units and formations of North Korea
Military units and formations established in 1946
1946 establishments in North Korea
Military of North Korea